Burning is a 2018 South Korean mystery drama film directed by Lee Chang-dong. The film stars Yoo Ah-in, Steven Yeun, and Jeon Jong-seo. The film is based on one of Haruki Murakami's seventeen short stories in The Elephant Vanishes, "Barn Burning". It was selected to compete for the Palme d'Or at the 2018 Cannes Film Festival and won the FIPRESCI Prize. It became the highest-rated film in the history of Screen International’s Cannes jury grid. It was also selected as the South Korean entry for the Best Foreign Language Film at the 91st Academy Awards and became the first Korean film to make it to the final nine-film shortlist.

The first film directed by Lee Chang-dong in eight years, Burning was among the lineup in competition entries announced for the 2018 Cannes Film Festival. Lee's 2007 film Secret Sunshine and 2010 film Poetry both premiered as in competition entries at the Cannes Film Festival.

The film was sold to more than 100 countries and territories at the Marché du Film in Cannes Film Festival. This include Hong Kong, China, Taiwan, Singapore, the United Kingdom, Japan, Australia, New Zealand, Spain, Greece, Poland and Turkey.

In South Korea, Burning premiered in theaters on May 17, 2018.

Accolades

Notes

See also
 List of South Korean films of 2018

References

External links 
 

Lists of accolades by film